Martinsthorpe is a civil parish in the county of Rutland in the East Midlands of England.

The village's name means 'outlying farm/settlement of Martin'.

It is located about four miles (6 km) south of Oakham near the village of Manton. It is the site of a deserted medieval village. Martinsthorpe is the only parish in Rutland to have no population, (although according to the 2001 census, Beaumont Chase also recorded a population of zero). It is one of only eight parishes in England with nil population.

One building remains in the parish; Old Hall Farmhouse, a Grade II listed building, prominent on the ridge. Originally this was part of the service wing of Martinsthorpe Hall, a seat of the Earls of Nottingham. After several decades unoccupied, it has been restored as a holiday let.

An ancient route, perhaps a true ridgeway of the Bronze Age, comes westwards from Stamford and follows the limestone ridge by Edith Weston, Manton and Martinsthorpe, entering Leicestershire near Withcote.

Ward
Martinsthorpe was an electoral division for the purposes of electing councillors to Rutland County Council and comprised the parishes of Gunthorpe, Lyndon, Manton, Martinsthorpe, Morcott, Pilton and Wing.

Since the 2019 election it has been merged to form the Braunston and Martinsthorpe ward, which elects two members to the County Council.

References

External links

Rutland website – Martinsthorpe
The Historian Winter 2011

Deserted medieval villages in Rutland
Civil parishes in Rutland